Kimberley Park railway station is a railway station in the village of Kimberley in the English county of Norfolk.

History

The Wymondham-Dereham branch line was built by the Norfolk Railway and the line and stations were opened on 15 February 1847. .

The station was rebuilt by the Great Eastern Railway and provided with a second platform when the line was doubled in the early 1880s.  A new up platform was constructed, and the existing buildings were given new glass-fronted passenger accommodation and platform canopies.  In 1882 the station was considered a request stop.

Until 1923 the station was known as 'Kimberley', but this was changed to 'Kimberley Park' during the Grouping to avoid confusion with Kimberley station in Nottinghamshire.  The main buildings were on the down platform, with a smaller waiting room being provided on the up.

The goods yard was situated on the down side of the line, comprising a single siding linked by trailing connections to the up and down main lines.  Kimberley was provided with loading docks and a cattle pen.

Present day
There is no public car parking at this station.  The station is served by heritage services operated by the Mid-Norfolk Railway on the line from Dereham to Wymondham Abbey.

A 5 sidings were built east the line at the 4-mile post, north of the station, using a former quarry and a part of the former main line formation. This was used to store new Class 745 and Class 755 rolling stock for Abellio Greater Anglia until they entered service. Most were brought directly to Kimberley Park from Ripple Lane exchange sidings after being dragged through the Channel Tunnel.

Ballast Pit Yard

A 5 road secure yard has been created to the north of the station as part of a £3.25M agreement to provide siding capacity for approximately 30 Class 755 multiple units for Greater Anglia.  A modification to the plan for the creation of this yard involved the removal of a section of the up formation of the line to slightly extend the storage capacity of one siding, replacing the original plan to relay the second line from Hardingham to Kimberley.

Signal box
The original standard GER signal box was located at the southern end of the down platform, where the footings can still be clearly seen. The Mid-Norfolk Railway published an intention to replace this 'box, in an alternate location on the currently out-of-use up platform, with the cabin from Soham.

References

Heritage railway stations in Norfolk
Former Great Eastern Railway stations
Railway stations in Great Britain opened in 1847
Railway stations in Great Britain closed in 1969
1847 establishments in England
1969 disestablishments in England
Kimberley, Norfolk